The 1961–62 Football League season was Birmingham City Football Club's 59th in the Football League and their 35th in the First Division. They finished in 17th position in the 22-team division. They entered the 1961–62 FA Cup in the third round proper and lost in that round to Tottenham Hotspur after a replay, and entered the League Cup at the first round, again losing their opening match after a replay, this time against Swindon Town. Birmingham lost in the final of the 1960–61 Inter-Cities Fairs Cup in October 1961, and only a few weeks later, were eliminated from the 1961–62 competition in the second round by Espanyol. This was Birmingham's last appearance in major European competition for nearly 50 years.

Twenty-five players made at least one appearance in nationally organised first-team competition, and there were eleven different goalscorers. Forward Mike Hellawell played in all 50 first-team matches over the season (half back Malcolm Beard missed only one), and Ken Leek and Jimmy Harris finished as joint leading goalscorers with 20 goals in all competitions; Leek was top scorer in league competition with 18 goals.

Football League First Division

League table (part)

FA Cup

League Cup

1960–61 Inter-Cities Fairs Cup

The final of the 1960–61 Inter-Cities Fairs Cup took place in late September and mid-October 1961, when the first round of the 1961–62 competition was already under way. In the semi-final, Birmingham had beaten Inter Milan home and away; no other English club beat them in a competitive match in the San Siro until Arsenal did so in the Champions League more than 40 years later. Birmingham played in the final for the second consecutive season, having lost to Barcelona in 1960. In the first leg, missed chances and poor defending allowed Roma to take a two-goal lead at St Andrew's, but second-half goals from Mike Hellawell and Bryan Orritt, whose late equaliser came after Jimmy Harris's shot rebounded from the crossbar, took Birmingham into the second leg on level terms. In front of a large crowd in the Stadio Olimpico, Roma won 2–0 to take the trophy 4–2 on aggregate.

1961–62 Inter-Cities Fairs Cup

As finalists in the previous season's competition, Birmingham were awarded a bye to the second round, in which they were drawn against Espanyol. They lost heavily in the first leg, in Barcelona, where Antonio Camps scored a hat-trick. They won the ill-tempered return leg 1–0 with a goal from Bertie Auld, but four players, including Birmingham's Jimmy Harris and Auld himself, were sent off.

Appearances and goals

Players with name struck through and marked  left the club during the playing season.

See also
Birmingham City F.C. seasons

Notes

References
General
 
 
 Source for match dates and results: 
 Source for lineups, appearances, goalscorers and attendances: Matthews (2010), Complete Record, pp. 358–59, 474–75.
 Source for kit: "Birmingham City". Historical Football Kits. Retrieved 22 May 2018.

Specific

Birmingham City F.C. seasons
Birmingham City